In chemistry, the rotational partition function relates the rotational degrees of freedom to the rotational part of the energy.

Definition 

The total canonical partition function  of a system of  identical, indistinguishable, noninteracting atoms or molecules can be divided into the atomic or molecular partition functions :

with:

For molecules, under the assumption that total energy levels  can be partitioned into its contributions from different degrees of freedom (weakly coupled degrees of freedom)

and the number of degenerate states are given as products of the single contributions

where "trans", "ns", "rot", "vib" and "e" denotes translational, nuclear spin, rotational and vibrational contributions as well as electron excitation, the molecular partition functions

can be written as a product itself

Linear molecules 

Rotational energies are quantized. For a diatomic molecule like CO or HCl or a linear polyatomic molecule like OCS in its ground vibrational state, the allowed rotational energies in the rigid rotor approximation are

Here we are using B in energy units. If it is expressed in frequency units, replace B by hB in all the expression that follow, where h is Planck's constant.

For each value of J, we have rotational degeneracy,  = (2J+1), so the rotational partition function is therefore

For all but the lightest molecules or the very lowest temperatures we have . This suggests we can approximate the sum by replacing the sum over J by an integral of J treated as a continuous variable.

This approximation is known as the high temperature limit. It is also called the classical approximation as this is the result for the canonical partition function for a classical rigid rod.

Using the Euler–Maclaurin formula an improved estimate can be found

Quantum symmetry effects 

The spin–statistics theorem of quantum mechanics requires that the total molecular wavefunction be either symmetric or antisymmetric with respect to this rotation depending upon whether an even or odd number of pairs of fermion nuclear pairs are exchanged. A given electronic & vibrational wavefunction will either be symmetric or antisymmetric with respect to this rotation. The nuclear spins states can be separated into those that are symmetric or antisymmetric with respect to the nuclear permutations produced by the rotation. Nuclei with an even nuclear mass number are bosons and have integer nuclear spin quantum number, I. Nuclei with odd mass number are fermions and had half integer I. For the case of H2, rotation exchanges a single pair of fermions and so the overall wavefunction must be antisymmetric under the half rotation. The vibration-electronic function is symmetric and so the rotation-vibration-electronic will be even or odd depending upon whether J is an even or odd integer. Since the total wavefunction must be odd, the even J levels can only use the antisymmetric functions (only one for I = 1/2) while the odd J levels can use the symmetric functions ( three for I = 1/2). For D2, I = 1 and thus there are six symmetric functions, which go with the even J levels to produce an overall symmetric wavefunction, and three antisymmetric functions that must go with odd J rotational levels to produce an overall even function. In the high temperature limit, it is traditional to correct for the missing nuclear spin states by dividing the rotational partition function by a factor  with  known as the rotational symmetry number which is 2 for linear molecules with a center of symmetry and 1 for linear molecules without.

Nonlinear molecules
In terms of these constants, the rotational partition function can be written in the high temperature limit as 

with  again known as the rotational symmetry number  which in general equals the number ways a molecule can be rotated to overlap itself in an indistinguishable way, i.e. that at most interchanges identical atoms. Like in the case of the diatomic treated explicitly above, this factor corrects for the fact that only a fraction of the nuclear spin functions can be used for any given molecular level to construct wavefunctions that overall obey the required exchange symmetries. Another convenient expression for the rotational partition function for symmetric and asymmetric tops is provided by Gordy and Cook:

where the prefactor comes from 

when A, B, and C are expressed in units of MHz. 

The expressions for  works for asymmetric, symmetric and spherical top rotors.

References

See also
 Translational partition function
 Vibrational partition function
 Partition function (mathematics)

Equations of physics
Partition functions